{|
{{Infobox ship image
| Ship image               =NASA's Ship-Aircraft Bio-Optical Research (SABOR) (15034073055).jpg
| Ship caption             =Wave crashing on Endeavors bow.
}}

|}RV Endeavor''' is a research vessel owned by the National Science Foundation and operated by the University of Rhode Island (URI) under a Charter Party Agreement as part of the University-National Oceanographic Laboratory System (UNOLS) fleet. The vessel is homeported at the Narragansett, Rhode Island at the URI Bay Campus.

The 185 foot Endeavor, built by Peterson Builders, Inc., Sturgeon Bay, Wisconsin, replaced RV Trident'' in 1976.

It was likely named for Captain James Cook's ship , for which the Space Shuttle Endeavour is also named.

References

External links 
 Research Vessel Endeavor
 URI Graduate School of Oceanography: Endeavor Specifications
 URI Marine Technical Services Group

University-National Oceanographic Laboratory System research vessels
1976 ships
Ships built by Peterson Builders